Vadakkoot Viswanatha Menon (15 January 1927 – 3 May 2019) was a Communist leader and former minister in the southern state of Kerala in India. He also served as a member in the Indian Parliament.

Early life 
Viswanatha Menon was born in Kochi as the son of Narayana Menon, a lawyer, and Vadakkoot Lakshmikkuttiyamma. His father belonged to Ambady, a famous Nair family of Cochin.

He was a political activist in his youth, accused in the Communist attack on the Edappally police station. He was a leader of Communist Party of India (Marxist) in Kerala. Starting his career as a student activist in the Indian independence movement in his alma mater Maharaja's College, Ernakulam, he became popularly known as Ambady Viswam among his peers, seniors and near ones.

Menon was one of the popular youth leaders in Kochi at that time, owing to his opinions and actions against the ruling elite. A follower of Mahatma Gandhi since childhood, he was inclined towards communism during his student days due to the influence  of prominent personalities around him, including his cousin A.K. Damodaran, former Indian Administrative Service official.

Career 
V. Viswanatha Menon was one of the earliest members of the undivided Communist Party of India in Kochi and played an essential role in building its base during the colonial and post-colonial period of the 1940s and early 1950s. Having sacrificed his aristocratic lifestyle at his affluent family, he worked among the party ranks against the exploitation of the oppressed classes.

The caste system left the less fortunate castes never achieving equal treatment. This continuing injustice inspired Menon to adopt Socialism and later on Democracy, as a means of addressing these ills.

He was a two-time Member of Parliament representing CPI and later the CPI(M). He served as Finance Minister in the 1987 E.K. Nayanar-led Left Democratic Front Government. He once held the record of having presented the lengthiest Budget speech in the Kerala Legislative Assembly.

He served as trade union president in FACT for 12 years, and in Indal for 14 years. He also led a Cochin Port union.

During early 2000s, he distanced himself from CPI(M) due to difference of opinion on party policies. He contested from Ernakulam constituency to Lok Sabha with support from Bharatiya Janata Party  and a rebel CPI(M) splinter group in 2004 and was defeated by Dr. Sebastian Paul.

References 

Communist Party of India (Marxist) politicians from Kerala
1927 births
2019 deaths
Malayali politicians